The 2004–05 St. Louis Blues season was the 38th for the National Hockey League franchise. However, its games were cancelled because of the lockout, that lasted from September 16, 2004 until July 22, 2005.

Schedule
The Blues preseason and regular season schedules were announced on July 14, 2004.

|-
| 1 || September 24 || Nashville Predators
|-
| 2 || September 25 || @ Nashville Predators
|-
| 3 || September 28 || Dallas Stars
|-
| 4 || October 2 || Chicago Blackhawks
|-
| 5 || October 8 || @ Chicago Blackhawks
|-
| 6 || October 9 || @ Dallas Stars
|-

|-
| 1 || October 15 || Chicago Blackhawks
|-
| 2 || October 16 || @ Nashville Predators
|-
| 3 || October 20 || @ Vancouver Canucks
|-
| 4 || October 21 || @ Calgary Flames
|-
| 5 || October 23 || @ Edmonton Oilers
|-
| 6 || October 26 || Buffalo Sabres
|-
| 7 || October 29 || @ New Jersey Devils
|-
| 8 || October 30 || San Jose Sharks
|-
| 9 || November 1 || Columbus Blue Jackets
|-
| 10 || November 4 || New York Islanders
|-
| 11 || November 6 || Montreal Canadiens
|-
| 12 || November 8 || @ Philadelphia Flyers
|-
| 13 || November 11 || Colorado Avalanche
|-
| 14 || November 13 || Anaheim Mighty Ducks
|-
| 15 || November 17 || @ Minnesota Wild
|-
| 16 || November 18 || @ Colorado Avalanche
|-
| 17 || November 20 || @ Phoenix Coyotes
|-
| 18 || November 23 || Calgary Flames
|-
| 19 || November 26 || @ Columbus Blue Jackets
|-
| 20 || November 27 || Detroit Red Wings
|-
| 21 || December 1 || @ Florida Panthers
|-
| 22 || December 2 || @ Tampa Bay Lightning
|-
| 23 || December 4 || Los Angeles Kings
|-
| 24 || December 6 || @ Detroit Red Wings
|-
| 25 || December 8 || Nashville Predators
|-
| 26 || December 9 || @ Pittsburgh Penguins
|-
| 27 || December 11 || Columbus Blue Jackets
|-
| 28 || December 15 || @ Dallas Stars
|-
| 29 || December 16 || Pittsburgh Penguins
|-
| 30 || December 18 || Phoenix Coyotes
|-
| 31 || December 22 || @ Washington Capitals
|-
| 32 || December 23 || @ Boston Bruins
|-
| 33 || December 26 || Detroit Red Wings
|-
| 34 || December 28 || Toronto Maple Leafs
|-
| 35 || December 30 || Colorado Avalanche
|-
| 36 || December 31 || @ Columbus Blue Jackets
|-
| 37 || January 2 || Los Angeles Kings
|-
| 38 || January 4 || Vancouver Canucks
|-
| 39 || January 6 || Edmonton Oilers
|-
| 40 || January 8 || Minnesota Wild
|-
| 41 || January 10 || @ Nashville Predators
|-
| 42 || January 12 || @ Anaheim Mighty Ducks
|-
| 43 || January 15 || @ San Jose Sharks
|-
| 44 || January 17 || @ Phoenix Coyotes
|-
| 45 || January 20 || Washington Capitals
|-
| 46 || January 22 || Chicago Blackhawks
|-
| 47 || January 24 || @ New York Rangers
|-
| 48 || January 25 || @ Buffalo Sabres
|-
| 49 || January 29 || Phoenix Coyotes
|-
| 50 || January 30 || @ Chicago Blackhawks
|-
| 51 || February 1 || Columbus Blue Jackets
|-
| 52 || February 3 || Carolina Hurricanes
|-
| 53 || February 5 || Dallas Stars
|-
| 54 || February 7 || @ Minnesota Wild
|-
| 55 || February 9 || @ Colorado Avalanche
|-
| 56 || February 10 || Anaheim Mighty Ducks
|-
| 57 || February 15 || Nashville Predators
|-
| 58 || February 17 || @ Detroit Red Wings
|-
| 59 || February 19 || Dallas Stars
|-
| 60 || February 21 || San Jose Sharks
|-
| 61 || February 24 || Vancouver Canucks
|-
| 62 || February 26 || @ Los Angeles Kings
|-
| 63 || February 27 || @ Anaheim Mighty Ducks
|-
| 64 || March 1 || Calgary Flames
|-
| 65 || March 3 || Edmonton Oilers
|-
| 66 || March 5 || @ Columbus Blue Jackets
|-
| 67 || March 6 || @ Chicago Blackhawks
|-
| 68 || March 10 || @ Vancouver Canucks
|-
| 69 || March 12 || @ Calgary Flames
|-
| 70 || March 15 || @ Edmonton Oilers
|-
| 71 || March 17 || @ San Jose Sharks
|-
| 72 || March 19 || @ Los Angeles Kings
|-
| 73 || March 22 || Ottawa Senators
|-
| 74 || March 24 || @ Detroit Red Wings
|-
| 75 || March 26 || Atlanta Thrashers
|-
| 76 || March 29 || Detroit Red Wings
|-
| 77 || March 31 || Minnesota Wild
|-
| 78 || April 2 || @ Nashville Predators
|-
| 79 || April 3 || Nashville Predators
|-
| 80 || April 6 || @ Chicago Blackhawks
|-
| 81 || April 9 || Chicago Blackhawks
|-
| 82 || April 10 || @ Dallas Stars
|-

Transactions
The Blues were involved in the following transactions from June 8, 2004, the day after the deciding game of the 2004 Stanley Cup Finals, through February 16, 2005, the day the  season was officially cancelled.

Trades

Players acquired

Players lost

Signings

Draft picks
St. Louis' picks at the 2004 NHL Entry Draft, which was held at the RBC Center in Raleigh, North Carolina on June 26–27, 2004.

Notes

References

St. Louis
St. Louis
St. Louis Blues seasons
St Louis
St Louis